Velcro may refer to:

Manufacture
 "Velcro", 1941, the trademarked name for the fabric brand hook-and-loop fastener
 Velcro Industries, 1950s, a multinational corporation of said fabric

Pets
 Velcro dog, a form of separation anxiety exhibited in dogs

Music
 "Velcro Fly", a 1985 song by the rock group ZZ Top
 Mr Velcro Fastener, a 1998 Finnish electro music duo